Manuk is an uninhabited volcanic island located in the Banda Sea, Indonesia. Administratively it is part of the Maluku Tengah Regency, Maluku Province.

Manuk means bird in various Austronesian languages.

Mount Manuk
Mount Manuk is a truncated andesitic volcano on Manuk Island. Rising 3,000 m from the sea floor, it is the easternmost volcano of the Banda Arc chain that forms a volcanic island. No confirmed historical eruptions are known from Manuk.

See also 

 List of volcanoes in Indonesia

References 

Uninhabited islands of Indonesia
Volcanoes of the Lesser Sunda Islands
Stratovolcanoes of Indonesia
Active volcanoes
Barat Daya Islands
Islands of the Maluku Islands
Holocene stratovolcanoes